Lee Young-ik is a South Korean assistant coach. He graduated in Korea University, and played for LG Cheetahs.  He was honoured as "K-League Best XI" on 1989. After retiring, he stood for Ulsan Hyundai Mipo Dockyard as a coach. On 2003, he moved to Daejeon Citizen and he has been one of Daejeon staff since then.

Honours

Player
Lucky-Goldstar Hwangso / LG Cheetahs / Anyang LG Cheetahs 
 K League 1 Winners (1) : 1990
 K League 1 Runners-up (1) : 1989
 League Cup Runners-up (1) 1994

Individual
K-League Best XI (1) : 1989

Club career statistics

Coach & Manager Career 
 1998-2002: Ulsan Hyundai Mipo Dockyard
 2003-2007: Daejeon Citizen

External links
 
 

1966 births
Living people
Association football defenders
South Korean footballers
FC Seoul players
FC Seoul non-playing staff
K League 1 players
Daejeon Hana Citizen FC managers
K League 2 managers
South Korean football managers
South Korea international footballers